1886 The Sheffield Brightside by-election was a parliamentary by-election held for the House of Commons constituency of Sheffield Brightside in the West Riding of Yorkshire on 9 February 1886.

Vacancy
Under the provisions of the Succession to the Crown Act of 1707 and a number of subsequent Acts, MPs appointed to certain ministerial and legal offices were at this time required to seek re-election. The by-election in Sheffield was caused by the appointment to the Cabinet of the sitting Liberal MP, Anthony John Mundella as President of the Board of Trade.

Candidates
Mundella had been the MP for Sheffield Brightside since 1885 and before that had represented Sheffield since 1868. He had held a number of government posts before and sought re-election again now as President of the Board of Trade. Although he had been opposed by the Conservative Lord Edmund Talbot in 1885, the Tories did not wish to contest Mundella’s appointment to the government and there being no other nominations, Mundella was returned unopposed.

The result

See also
List of United Kingdom by-elections 
United Kingdom by-election records

References

1886 elections in the United Kingdom
1886 in England
19th century in Yorkshire
February 1886 events
By-elections to the Parliament of the United Kingdom in Sheffield constituencies
Unopposed ministerial by-elections to the Parliament of the United Kingdom in English constituencies
19th century in Sheffield